Dream speech (in German Traumsprache) is internal speech in which errors occur during a dream. The term was coined by Emil Kraepelin in his 1906 monograph titled Über Sprachstörungen im Traume ("On Language Disturbances in Dreams"). The text discussed various forms of dream speech, outlining 286 examples. Dream speech is not to be confounded with the 'language of dreams', which refers to the visual means of representing thought in dreams.

Three types of dream speech were considered by Kraepelin: disorders of word-selection (also called paraphasias), disorders of discourse (e.g. agrammatisms) and thought disorders. The most frequent occurring form of dream speech is a neologism.

While Kraepelin was interested in the psychiatric as well as the psychological aspects of dream speech, modern researchers have been interested in speech production in dreams as illuminating aspects of cognition in the dreaming mind. They have found that during dream speech, Wernicke's area is not functioning well, but Broca's area is, leading to proper grammar but little meaning.

Kraepelin's research
Kraepelin studied dream speech because it provided him with clues to the analogous language disturbances of patients with schizophrenia. Still in 1920 he stated that "dream speech in every detail corresponds to schizophrenic speech disorder."

In his monograph Kraepelin presented 286 examples of dream speech, mainly his own. After 1906 he continued to collect samples of dream speech until his death in 1926. This time the dream speech specimens were almost exclusively his own and the original hand written dream texts are still available today at the Archive of the Max Planck Institute of Psychiatry in Munich. These new dream speech specimens have been published in 1993 in Heynick (in part in English translation) and in 2006 in the original German, with numerous valuable notes added. The second dream corpus has not been censored and dates are added to the dreams. As Kraepelin in 1906 had been collecting dream speech for more than 20 years, he jotted down his dream speech specimens for more than 40 years, with a scientific viewpoint in mind.

Kraepelin's dream speech started during a period (1882–1884) of personal crisis and depression. In 1882 Kraepelin was fired after working only a few weeks at the Leipzig psychiatric clinic and two months later his father died.

Schizophrenic speech disorder
Kraepelin had been confronted with schizophrenic speech disorder - called first Sprachverwirrtheit then schizophrene Sprachverwirrtheit and finally Schizophasie - produced by his patients. But —as Kraepelin states—  the schizophasia can hardly be studied, because what the patient is trying to express is unknown.

However using the classical dream-psychosis analogy, he tried to first study dream speech in the hope that this would lead to insights into schizophrenic speech disorder. And so Kraepelin got used to recording his dreams, not to interpret them for personal use as in psychoanalysis, but to use them for a scientific study. Kraepelin was not only able to record the deviant speech in his dreams, but also the intended utterance (which was lacking in the deviant speech of his patients, who clearly cannot cross the boundary from psychosis to reality). For example, most neologisms (the deviant utterance) in Kraepelin's dreams have a meaning (the intended utterance).

Fundamental disturbances
Kraepelin pointed out two fundamental disturbances underlying dream speech: a diminished functioning of the Wernicke area, and a diminished functioning of those frontal areas in which abstract reasoning is localized. Therefore, individual ideas (Individualvorstellungen) get expressed in dreams instead of general ideas. Among these individual ideas he included proper names in their widest sense.

Chaika vs. Fromkin
As Kraepelin likened dream speech to schizophasia, what is the current view on the last disorder? While in the famous debate during the '70s between the linguists Elaine Chaika and Victoria Fromkin on schizophrenic speech, Chaika long held the position that schizophasia was sort of an intermittent aphasia while Fromkin stated that schizophrenic speech errors could also occur in "normals," the debate has now been ended because according to Chaika

She also thinks that

Chaika compares schizophrenic speech errors with intricate speech errors, difficult to analyze. The current Chaika position comes close to Kraepelin's position, who noted that errors as in schizophasia can also occur in normals in dreams.

Cognitive dream speech research
At first sight dream speech plays only a marginal role in dream theory. However the important connection of dream and speech is very well illustrated by the following statement of David Foulkes: "However visual dreaming may seem, it may be planned and regulated by the human speech production system."

Recent research has confirmed one of Kraepelin's fundamental disturbances. In the book The Committee of Sleep, Harvard psychologist Deirdre Barrett describes examples of dreamed literature—in which the dreamers heard or read words which they awakened later wrote and published. She observes that almost all the examples are of poetry rather than prose or fiction, the only exceptions being one- or several-word phrases such as the Book title Vanity Fair which came to Thackeray in a dream, or similarly Katherine Mansfield's Sun and Moon. Barrett suggests that the reason poetry fares better in dreams is that grammar seems to be well preserved in dream language while meaning suffers and rhyme and rhythm are more prominent than when awake—all characteristics which benefit poetry but not other forms.

In other work, Barrett has studied verbatim language in college students' dreams and found them similar in these characteristics—intact grammar, poor meaning, rhythm and rhyme—to the literary examples. She observes that this is suggestive that of the two language centers in the brain, Wernicke's area must not be functioning well, but Broca's area seems to be as this language resembles that of patients with Wernicke's aphasia. Essentially the same conclusion Kraepelin reached in 1906.

Application: dream speech and Elyn Saks
In her book The Center Cannot Hold  Elyn Saks gives several examples of word salad arising during psychotic episodes. But an explanation or helping intervention by her therapists seems lacking. Instead new antipsychotics are recommended each time.

There is however a striking resemblance between an aspect of dream 51 in Kraepelin's monograph and a psychosis of Saks arising because she received for a memo a generally very good (that is not excellent) from her professor Bob Cover.

In dream 51 the strange phrase tripap=3 can be explained by reading pap as a rebus p-a-p, that is p without p, thereby eliminating pap from tripap  and leaving tri=3, a true statement, because tri is Russian for 3. Understanding the rebus as well as seeing that Kraepelin in his dream is concentrating on letters is essential here.

Equally, looking in the first name Bob at letters, a logical expression 'B or B' goes in hidden, once the middle o is interpreted as the Spanish word for 'or'. Now B is an academic mark of the second highest standard (after an A). The first name of her professor is thus linked with an academic mark and the attention for this name, then leads to the first names Elyn and Ronna of Saks, explaining the start of her psychotic episode, soon leading to her remarking that there are no no's (compare an no in Ronna) in a law book and reciting in Greek from Aristotle. the father of logic.

See also
 Kraepelin on Freud's Signorelli parapraxis
 Schizophasia
 Personal names in dichotic listening tasks
 Intrapersonal communication 
 Somniloquy, a parasomnia in which a person physically speaks while asleep
 Verbal language in dreams

Notes

References

Basic publications

 Engels, Huub (2006). Emil Kraepelins Traumsprache 1908–1926. 
 Heynick, F. (1993). Language and its disturbances in dreams: the pioneering work of Freud and Kraepelin updated. New York: Wiley.
 Kraepelin, E. (1906). Über Sprachstörungen im Traume. Leipzig: Engelmann.

Further reading
 Chaika, E. (1995). On analysing schizophrenic speech: what model should we use? In A. Sims (ed.) Speech and Language Disorder in Psychiatry.pp. 47–56. London: Gaskell
 Engels, Huub (2009). Emil Kraepelins Traumsprache: erklären und verstehen. In Dietrich von Engelhardt und Horst-Jürgen Gerigk (ed.). Karl Jaspers im Schnittpunkt von Zeitgeschichte, Psychopathologie, Literatur und Film. p. 331–43.  Heidelberg: Mattes Verlag.
 Kilroe, Patricia A. (2001). Verbal Aspects of Dreaming: A Preliminary Classification. Dreaming: Journal of the Association for the Study of Dreams. Vol 11(3) 105–113, Sep 2001.
 Kraepelin, E. (1920). Die Erscheinungsformen des Irreseins.
 Saks, Elyn. (2007). The Center Cannot Hold. My Journey through Madness. New York: Hyperion.

External links

 Kraepelin's monograph Über Sprachstörungen im Traume
 PhD thesis (2005) on Kraepelin's dream speech summary in English on pages 207–214. The Kraepelin-code, detected by sort of a cryptanalysis of numerous dream speech specimens, consists of various words associated to the proper name Kraepelin. One such code word is Greek kraipalè, meaning 'hangover.' The smallest code word reads Ka, an ancient-Egyptian word for life force. The code words drive the associations leading form the intended to the disturbed utterances in dreams. (ch. 6 lists several code words).
 article on Kraepelin's dream speech in German on pages 92-101
 dreaming in foreign languages

Speech
Language disorders

nl:Kraepelin's droomtaal